
These are the official results of the women's long jump event at the 1987 IAAF World Championships in Rome, Italy. There were a total number of 29 participating athletes, with two qualifying groups and the final held on Friday 4 September 1987.

Medalists

Schedule
All times are Central European Time (UTC+1)

Records
Existing records at the start of the event.

The following new world and championship records were set during this competition.

Final

Qualifying round
Held on Thursday 1987-09-03

Pool 1

Pool 2

References
 Results

- Women's Long Jump, 1987 World Championships In Athletics
Long jump at the World Athletics Championships
1987 in women's athletics